The following is a list of charter schools in Indiana (including networks of such schools) grouped by county.

Statewide

 Indiana Connections Academy
 Indiana Connections Career Academy
 Insight School of Indiana
 Options Charter School
 Paramount Online Academy
 Phalen Virtual Academy

Allen County

 Smith Academy for Excellence
 Timothy L. Johnson Leadership Academy

Clark County
 Rock Creek Community Academy

Delaware County
 Inspire Academy

Floyd County
 Community Montessori School

Hamilton County
 Options Charter School (Carmel, Noblesville)

Hancock County
 Geist Montessori School

Jefferson County
 Canaan Community Academy

Lake County

 21st Century Charter School of Gary
 Aspire Charter Academy
 Charter School of the Dunes
 East Chicago Lighthouse Charter School
 East Chicago Urban Enterprise Academy
 Gary Lighthouse Charter School
 Gary Middle College (East, West)
 Hammond Academy of Science and Technology
 Higher Institute of Arts and Technology
 Steel City Academy
 Thea Bowman Leadership Academy

Laporte County
 Renaissance Academy

Madison County
 Anderson Preparatory Academy

Marion County

 ACE Preparatory Academy
 Allegiant Preparatory Academy
 Andrew J. Brown Academy
 Avondale Meadows Academy
 Believe Circle City Academy
 Charles A. Tindley Accelerated School
 Christel House Academy (DORS, South, West)
 Circle City Prep
 Damar Charter Academy
 Dynamic Minds Academy
 Emma Donnan School (Adelante)
 Enlace Academy
 GEO Next Generation Academy
 George & Veronica Phalen Leadership Academy
 Global Prep Academy
 Herron High School
 HIM by HER Collegiate School for the Arts
 Hoosier Academy
 Hope Academy
 Ignite Achievement Academy
 Indiana Math & Science Academy (North, West)
 Indianapolis Metropolitan High School
 Invent Learning Hub
 Irvington Community School
 Kindezi Academy
 KIPP Indy (Legacy, Middle, Unite)
 Matchbook Learning
 Paramount (Cottage Home, Englewood)
 Paramount School of Excellence Brookside
 PATH School 67
 Phalen (93, 103, Leadership Academy)
 Purdue Polytechnic High School (North, Englewood)
 Riverside High School
 Rooted School
 Southeast Neighborhood School of Excellence (SENSE)
 Tindley Academy (Genesis, Summit)
 UrbanACT Academy
 Vanguard Collegiate School
 Victory College Prep
 Vision Academy

Monroe County
 Seven Oaks Classical School

Pike County
 Otwell Miller Academy

Porter County

 Discovery Charter School
 Neighbors' New Vistas High School

Rush County
 Mays Community Academy

St. Joseph County

 Career Academy Middle/High School
 Purdue Polytechnic High School
 Success Academy

Sullivan County
 Rural Community Academy

Vanderburgh County

 Joshua Academy
 Signature School

References 

Charter